The  is a member of the cabinet and is the leader and chief executive of the Cabinet Secretariat of Japan. The Chief Cabinet Secretary coordinates the policies of ministries and agencies in the executive branch, and also serves as the government's press secretary. The secretary is a statutory member of the National Security Council, and is appointed by the Emperor upon the nomination by the Prime Minister. The Chief Cabinet Secretary is the first in line of succession to the Prime Minister, unless the office of the Deputy Prime Minister is occupied.

In March 1879, the precursor of the position, the Secretary-General of the Cabinet, was created. The modern position was created on May 3, 1947, shortly after the passage of the Constitution of Japan, and elevated to ministerial status in 1966.

Since 1947, the office of Chief Cabinet Secretary has been regarded as a stepping stone to the post of Prime Minister. The first Chief Cabinet Secretary to become Prime Minister was Ichirō Hatoyama, who served in the position under Tanaka Giichi. Since then, eight other former Chief Cabinet Secretaries have become Prime Ministers, most recently Shinzō Abe, Yasuo Fukuda, and Yoshihide Suga.

Yoshihide Suga, who later became Prime Minister of Japan, served as Chief Cabinet Secretary under Shinzo Abe for nearly eight years, making him the longest-serving Chief Cabinet Secretary in history, having overtaken the previous record of 1,289 days in office set by Fukuda on July 7, 2016.

The current Chief Cabinet Secretary is Hirokazu Matsuno, who took office on 4 October 2021.

List of Secretary-Generals of the Cabinet

Shōwa Era 
Tsukamoto Kiyoji (December 25, 1926 – April 20, 1927)
Ichirō Hatoyama (April 20, 1927 – July 2, 1929) - later became prime minister in the mid-1950s.
6 other holders (July 3, 1929 – October 19, 1934)
Shigeru Yoshida (October 20, 1934 – May 11, 1935) - not to be confused with PM Shigeru Yoshida.
14 other holders (May 12, 1935 – April 6, 1945)
Hisatsune Sakomizu (7 April 1945 – 15 August 1945)
vacant (August 16, 1945 – October 9, 1945)
Daizaburō Tsugita (October 9, 1945 – January 13, 1946)
Wataru Narahashi (January 13, 1946 – May 22, 1946)
Jyōji Hayashi (May 22, 1946 – May 2, 1947)

List of Chief Cabinet Secretaries

Shōwa Era

Heisei Era

Reiwa Era

See also
White House Chief of Staff
Chief Presidential Secretary

Notes

References
Footnotes

Notes